

History

In 1477 William Caxton in Westminster printed The Dictes or Sayengis of the Philosophres, considered "the first dated book printed in England."

The history of the book in the United Kingdom has been studied from a variety of cultural, economic, political, and social angles. The learned Bibliographical Society first met in 1892. In recent years influential scholars include Frederic Sutherland Ferguson, Philip Gaskell, Ronald Brunlees McKerrow, and Alfred W. Pollard.

Publishers
, seven firms in the United Kingdom rank among the world's biggest publishers of books in terms of revenue: Bloomsbury, Cambridge University Press, Informa, Oxford University Press, Pearson, Quarto, and RELX Group.

Bookselling

The Antiquarian Booksellers Association formed in 1906, and the Provincial Booksellers Fairs Association in 1972.

Collections

The University of Oxford's Bodleian Library was founded in 1602.

The British Library was formally established in 1973, its collection previously part of the British Museum (est. 1753).

The Legal Deposit Libraries Act 2003 stipulates that the British Library receives a copy of every printed work published in the United Kingdom. Five other libraries are entitled to copies: Cambridge University Library, University of Oxford's Bodleian Library, the National Library of Scotland, the Library of Trinity College, Dublin, and the National Library of Wales. The London-based Copyright Agency became the Edinburgh-based Agency for the Legal Deposit Libraries in 2009.

Clubs
 "Richard & Judy Book Club," broadcast on Channel 4 TV
 "Bookclub," on BBC Radio 4

Digitization
US-based Google Inc. began scanning pages of Bodleian Library volumes in 2005, as part of its new Google Books Library Project.

See also
 Copyright law of the United Kingdom
 List of largest book publishers of the United Kingdom
 British National Bibliography
 English Short Title Catalogue
 Eighteenth Century Collections Online
 
 Children's books: United Kingdom and List of UK children's book publishers
 British bibliophiles

Images

Notes

References

Bibliography
published in 19th century
  + v.2
 
 

published in 20th century
 
 
 
 
 
 
 
 J. Raven, H. Small, and N. Tadmor (eds.), The Practice and Representation of Reading in England (Cambridge UP, 1996)
  (6 volumes)

published in 21st century
 
 
 . Contains chapters: "Britain, c.1475-1800" by Andrew Murphy; "Britain, 1801-1914" by Leslie Howsam; "Britain from 1914" by Claire Squires

External links

  (Bibliography of editions published in present-day UK; also browsable by town)
 
  (Includes works about history of books in the UK)
 .  (Includes articles on UK book history)
 University of London’s Society of Bibliophiles
  
 

United Kingdom
Mass media in the United Kingdom
 
Libraries in the United Kingdom